Zukan Helez (born 1 January 1964) is a Bosnian politician serving as Minister of Defence since January 2023. He is also the current Vice-chairman of the Council of Ministers of Bosnia and Herzegovina, serving alongside Zoran Tegeltija. He was previously a member of the House of Representatives.

Helez served as Federal Minister for Veterans and Disabled Veterans from 2011 to 2015. He is a member of the Social Democratic Party.

Early life and education
Helez was born on 1 January 1964 in Kupres where he finished elementary school. He attended high school in Bugojno between 1979 and 1983, after which he attended the Faculty of Science and Mathematics in Sarajevo, where he graduated in 1988. After his studies, Helez got a job as a professor in Skender Vakuf. In May 1992, at the beginning of the Bosnian War, he became a member of the Army of the Republic of Bosnia and Herzegovina.

After he was demobilized at the end of the war, Helez started working as a teacher in secondary schools in Donji Vakuf and Bugojno. In Italy, Germany and France, he participated in international seminars in the secondary education reform project in Bosnia and Herzegovina.

Political career
A member of the Social Democratic Party (SDP BiH), Helez was elected vice president of the SDP BiH Cantonal Committee of the Central Bosnia Canton in 2003, and president in 2005. At the 2000 parliamentary election, he was elected to the Federal House of Representatives. He was re-elected at the 2002, 2006 and the 2010 general elections.

Helez served his fourth term in the Federal Parliament until 17 March 2011, when he was appointed Federal Minister for Veterans and Disabled Veterans in the government of Nermin Nikšić. He served as Federal minister until 31 March 2015. In the Federal House of Representatives, he was a member of several working bodies, boards and commissions as vice president and president.

At the 2018 general election, Helez was elected to the national House of Representatives. He was re-elected to the national House of Representatives at the 2022 general election.

Minister of Defence (2023–present)

Appointment

On 25 January 2023, following the formation of a new Council of Ministers presided over by Borjana Krišto, Helez was appointed as the new Minister of Defence and also as vice-chairman of the Council of Ministers within Krišto's government.

Personal life
Helez is married and has three children. Besides his native Bosnian, he speaks English and Russian fluently.

References

External links

Zukan Helez at sdp.ba

1964 births
Living people
Academic staff of the University of Sarajevo
Army of the Republic of Bosnia and Herzegovina soldiers
Bosnia and Herzegovina politicians
Politicians of the Federation of Bosnia and Herzegovina
Social Democratic Party of Bosnia and Herzegovina politicians
Members of the House of Representatives (Bosnia and Herzegovina)
Government ministers of Bosnia and Herzegovina
Defence ministers of Bosnia and Herzegovina